Moinuddin Khan (died 2017) was a veteran Indian classical instrumentalist and vocalist, who played sarangi. Based in Jaipur, he belonged to the "Jaipur gharana" of Hindustani classical music.

Khan has performed his music for All India Radio, Jaipur, in solo programmes.

In 2014, the Government of India conferred upon him its fourth-highest civilian award the Padma Shri.

His grandson Zakir Khan is a famous comedian and aspiring Urdu Poet

Early life and background
Moinuddin Khan belongs to a traditional family of musicians of Jaipur.  Khan Saab inherited the art of music form and started his musical training in sarangi at age 7 from his father Ustad Mehboob Khan who was a  well-known Sarangi player.  Ustad Mehaboob Khan himself has trained a number of students and the most outstanding students among them is the well known Pandit Ram Narayanji.  Ustad Moinuddin Khan hails from a family of noted musicians.

Career
He worked with All India Radio, Jaipur as sarangi player for several years. Over the years he has given solo performances, on state-run Doordarshan television channel, and also All India Radio. Besides this he has also performed at concerts in countries like France, Czech Republic, Denmark, Germany and other European countries. He also accompanied on sarangi notable vocalists like Ghulam Ali Khan, Amir Khan, Bhimsen Joshi, Begum Akhtar, Faiyaz Khan, and tabla maestro, Zakir Hussain at various concerts.

He has also received acclaim to his sarangi renditions as he appeared in a sequence of 1999 English film, Holy Smoke!, shot in Pushkar. He was shown playing sarangi along with his disciples and actress Kate Winslet also featured in the scene.

He won several state-level and national-level awards during his career, including a state-level award on Republic Day, 1994. He was awarded the Rajasthan Sangeet Natak Akademi Award for the year 2001-2002. In 2006, he received the annual Dagar Gharana honour given by Maharana Mewar Foundation of Udaipur for his contribution to the promotion of classical music.

He spent his last days in the Kalyanji Ka Rasta area within the Walled City area of Jaipur, where he continued to teach his disciples employing the guru-shishya tradition, sarangi, violin, and Hindustani classical singing till his death.

References

External links
 

20th-century births
2017 deaths
All India Radio people
Hindustani instrumentalists
Hindustani singers
Indian male classical musicians
Indian Muslims
Musicians from Jaipur
Recipients of the Padma Shri in arts
Sarangi players
Year of birth missing
Place of birth missing